"It's About Time" is an album recorded under the label "Label Bleu" and features George Russell with his Living Time Orchestra. This album was released on February 25, 1997.

Tracks
	It's About Time Part I			
	It's About Time Part II			
	Event I See All 4			
	Event II See All 4			
	Event III See All 5			
	Event IV See All 4			
	Event V See All 3			
	Event VI			
	Event VII			
	Event VIII

References

George Russell (composer) albums
1997 albums
Label Bleu albums